Tikhonravov may refer to:

 Mikhail Tikhonravov (1900–1974), Soviet aerospace engineer and scientist
 Nikolai Tikhonravov (1832–1893), Russian philologist and historian of Russian literature
 Tikhonravov (crater), large, eroded crater in the Arabia quadrangle of Mars